The Stevens-Buchanan House is a historic mansion in Brandon, Mississippi, U.S.. It was built in 1868 for James Richardson Stevens and his wife, Martha L. Patton. It was designed in the Greek Revival and Italianate architectural styles. It has been listed on the National Register of Historic Places since May 5, 1978.

References

Houses on the National Register of Historic Places in Mississippi
Greek Revival architecture in Mississippi
Italianate architecture in Mississippi
Houses completed in 1869
National Register of Historic Places in Rankin County, Mississippi
Brandon, Mississippi